Satis is an urban locality (an urban-type settlement) in Nizhny Novgorod Oblast, Russia. Population:

History
The settlement was based in 1912 by Semen Fedorovich Kundashkin who was a local timber manufacturer and is situated on the bank of the river Satis for which it is named. 
There is a furniture factory in the locality, built in 1952, and an orthodox church, Church of St.Seraphim of Sarov (2008).

Climate
Satis has a humid continental climate (Köppen climate classification Dfb) with long cold winter starting in mid-November and ending in the first half of April, and warm, often hot dry summers. The warmest month is July with daily mean temperature near +20 °C (68 °F), the coldest month is January −12 °C (10 °F)

Main sights
There is a holy spring located 8 kilometers westwards from the settlement

References

Urban-type settlements in Nizhny Novgorod Oblast
Pervomaysk Urban Okrug